The Casa Encantada at 10644 Bellagio Road in Bel Air, Los Angeles is a large detached neoclassical style house completed in 1938. It was designed by James Dolena with interiors and furnishings by T. H. Robsjohn-Gibbings. It has twice established a record for the most expensive house sold in the United States.

History
The house was commissioned by Hilda Olsen Boldt Weber (1885–1951) who in 1936 bought 9.5 acres on a hill-top site from the Bel-Air Country Club for $100,000 ( (or $5.2 million in gold (1936 equivalence)). The address is now 10644 Bellagio Road. The architectural historian and real estate executive Jeffrey Hyland, writing in The Legendary Estates of Beverly Hills describes the price paid by Weber for the site as being an "astonishing sum" to have been paid in the midst of the Great Depression as comparable large estates had remained unsold for many years at similar prices. Unlike other prominent local residents, Weber was an outsider to the Los Angeles motion picture community and was a member of the nouveau riche, having married a wealthy glass manufacturer. The landscape architect Benjamin Morton Purdy re-designed the gardens in 1935 under Weber's patronage. The house was completed in December 1938 at a total cost in excess of $2 million, the corner-stone having been laid in May 1937 by Weber and her contractor, landscape designer, and architect. Weber sought acceptance among the social elite of Los Angeles, and threw huge parties in an attempt to cement her position. The cost of the construction and decoration of the house had cost almost Weber's entire net worth, and she continued to be profligate, with a combined household and grounds staff of more than 40 employees. The cost of her lifestyle necessitated the sale of her other house in Santa Barbara to the  Marymount School in 1942.

To showcase their new home, the Webers hosted a seated dinner for 250 and dance shortly after Christmas in 1938 at a cost of $50,000. Louis B. Mayer said of the house that "If I had not gone inside myself I would not have believed such a residence existed in the world". Weber put the house and its contents up for sale in 1948 for $1.5 million, less than its purchase price a decade earlier. Among the buyers that were approached were the set designer Cedric Gibbons and his wife, the actress Dolores del Rio, and the Metro-Goldwyn-Mayer co-founder Louis B. Mayer and the publisher William Randolph Hearst. It sold in November 1950 to Conrad Hilton for $225,000 who occupied the house until his death in 1979. Weber committed suicide by overdosing on sleeping pills the year after the sale of the house, overwhelmed by her precarious financial situation and unpaid bills.  Hilton described his enchantment with the house as "...a case of love at first sight...I couldn't resist it, one of the fabulous houses of the world". He renamed the property the Casa Encantada.

Following Hilton's death the house was sold to financier David H. Murdock for $12.4 million in 1980, establishing a record for the most expensive house sold in the United States. He renamed the house 'Bellagio House'. Murdock sold the original Robsjohn-Gibbings furniture designed for the house in a two-day sale fetching $700,000 in 1981; the individual pieces have remained popular with collectors. Murdock used the house to display his extensive collection of English furniture and  redesigned the landscaped grounds. In 2000 it was sold by Murdock to the businessman Gary Winnick for $94 million again setting the record for the most expensive house sold in the United States. Winnick had originally intended to build his own house on nearby plots of land, but was invited to the house by Murdock, and the pair agreed the sale of the house over breakfast. Winnick subsequently acquired some of the original Robsjohn-Gibbings furnishings and restored them to the Casa Encantada. In his office at the house Winnick displayed a replica of Gilbert Stuart's Athenaeum Portrait of George Washington, which was used for Washington's portrayal on the United States one-dollar bill and a framed copy of the Twelfth Amendment to the United States Constitution. Architect Peter Marino restored and enhanced the house over two years at a cost of several million dollars under Winnick's patronage.

In October 2019 the Casa Encantada was put up for sale by Winnick through Rick Hilton and Jeffrey Hyland's real estate agency Hilton and Hyland for $225 million. The house is hidden from the street and surrounded by mature trees and the golf courses of the Bel-Air Country Club. Hyland speculated in 2019 that the land value of the house was $175 million and it was impossible to 'duplicate' such a residence in the present era owing to a lack of craftspeople and the prohibitive building costs.

The house was featured in an 18-page article in Architectural Digest in 1940. The completed interiors of the Casa Encantada were photographed in 1938 by Maynard L. Parker. He had previously photographed Robsjohn-Gibbings's decorative work for the interior of Paul Flato's shop at 8637 Sunset Boulevard in Hollywood.

Design
Weber commissioned James Dolena to design her new residence in March 1936. Dolena's working drawings described the style of the new house as "modern Georgian with Grecian influences", a nod to the Georgian revival architecture then in vogue with influences from Ancient Greek and Roman architecture. Robsjohn-Gibbings work for Casa Encantada is not rooted in a dominant aesthetic style, though it embodies neo-classicism, incorporating the art of Ancient Greece and elements of Art Deco. Work on the interior of the Casa Encantada was the responsibility of Peterson Studios of Santa Barbara and the English furniture and interior designer T. H. Robsjohn-Gibbings, who created and manufactured carpets, fabrics and more than two hundred pieces of furniture for the house. Each of Robsjohn-Gibbings's pieces was stamped 'Robsjohn-Gibbings – Sans epoque'; to express the timelessness of his creations and their lack of constraint to any individual historical period. Weber's patronage of Robsjohn-Gibbings was atypical among her contemporaries; other wealthy property owners who would purchase overpriced reproduction furniture from department stores.

The main house is designed in an 'H' shape. The house and its outbuildings were made from reinforced concrete with a stone coloured finish An Italianate fountain in the driveway court to the north forms the extremity of an axial plan that passes through the centre of the house, culminating in a pool house on a ridge that overlooks a golf course in the grounds. A large foyer greeted guests through the front door, with a circular stairway that led to the upper floors. A gallery with floor-to-ceiling windows opened onto a south facing patio that overlooked the terraced lawn that led to the swimming pool and cabana. The garden features were inspired by Ancient Greek and Roman landscapes and included bronze sculptures and fountains designed by the American sculptor Gladys Lewis Bush.

The finished house and its outbuildings were 40,000 sq ft in size. The completed main house was almost 30,000 square-foot in size with servants quarters in the two storey garage and a two-storey guesthouse. Amenities in the grounds included badminton and tennis courts with galleries for spectators and a swimming pool. A tunnel connected the grounds of the house to the fairways of the Bel-Air Country Club. In recent deacdes the grounds have included a basketball and tennis court and a rose garden and koi ponds. Conrad Hilton preserved the house and its contents for several decades after his 1950 purchase which Hyland described as an "extraordinary time capsule of high-style 1940s taste". Hilton self-published a book about the house in which he described the 'clearly discernible Greek influences' of the house with its aesthetic lines sweeping in 'regal beauty...carry[ing] a classical motif into the interior through columns of Doric and Ionic simplicity. Doors, rugs, upholstering, draperies, decorative objects, all bear the integrating mark of the Greek key design'. The setting of the house and the rich colours and harmonic texture of its design helped 'shrink the architectural mass a third of a city block in size to the conceptual intimacy of a country cottage'.

References

Works cited
 

Bel Air, Los Angeles
Houses completed in 1938
Houses in Los Angeles County, California
Neoclassical architecture in California
1938 establishments in California